Gymnopilus subcarbonarius is a species of mushroom in the family Hymenogastraceae.

See also

List of Gymnopilus species

External links
Gymnopilus subcarbonarius at Index Fungorum

subcarbonarius
Taxa named by William Alphonso Murrill